Yunusoğlu is a village in Tarsus district of Mersin Province, Turkey. It is also a stop on railroad. The population of Yunusoğlu was 510  as of 2011.

References

Villages in Tarsus District